The Schaffer Farmstead is a historic house in Yankton, South Dakota. It was built in 1889, and designed in the vernacular Italianate architectural style. The original homestead was established by Frank Schaffer in 1873. It has been listed on the National Register of Historic Places since April 16, 1980.

References

	
National Register of Historic Places in Yankton County, South Dakota
Houses completed in 1889